The name Selma has been used for three tropical cyclones in the Eastern Pacific Ocean. 

 Tropical Storm Selma (1970)
 Tropical Storm Selma (1987) – No threat to land.
 Tropical Storm Selma (2017) – Minimal tropical storm that made landfall in El Salvador, causing minor damage.

The name Selma has been used for one tropical cyclone in the Australian Region.
 Cyclone Selma (1974)

Pacific hurricane set index articles
Australian region cyclone set index articles